Ayis Capéronis (born 21 March 1950) is a Swiss former butterfly swimmer. He competed in two events at the 1968 Summer Olympics.

References

External links
 

1950 births
Living people
Swiss male butterfly swimmers
Olympic swimmers of Switzerland
Swimmers at the 1968 Summer Olympics
Sportspeople from Lausanne